Afterward is an upcoming American thriller drama film written and directed by Dito Montiel. The film stars Aaron Eckhart, Terrence Howard, and George Lopez.

Cast
 Aaron Eckhart
 Terrence Howard
 George Lopez

Production
In September 2019, Angel Oak Films announced that they will produce and fully fund the Cineville production to be directed by Dito Montiel and starring Aaron Eckhart. The following year, Grindstone Entertainment Group acquired the distribution rights for North America and Latin America.

In December 2020, George Lopez joined Eckhart and Terrence Howard in the cast of the film.

Principal photography began on March 14, 2021 and concluded on April 14, 2021 in Humboldt County, California.

References

External links
 

Upcoming films
American thriller drama films
Films directed by Dito Montiel